The Ministry of Education of Chile (MINEDUC) is the Ministry of State responsible for promoting the development of education at all levels, to assure all people access to basic education, to stimulate scientific and technological research and artistic creation, and the protection and enhancement of cultural heritage of the nation of Chile.

The current Minister of Education, since 11 March 2022, is Marco Antonio Ávila.

History 

The ministry began in 1837 as part of the Ministry of Justice and Religious Instruction.  In those years the ministry was responsible for overseeing educational institutions such as the Instituto Nacional de Chile and Universidad de Chile.  Since 1887 it was named Ministry of Justice and Public Instruction.

The Ministry of Education was separated from the Ministry of Justice in 1927, and became responsible for primary education, secondary education, vocational education, libraries, archives and museums.

During the government of Eduardo Frei Montalva, the following institutions were created under Ministry of Education:
 Junta Nacional de Auxilio Escolar y Becas/National Board of School Assistance and Scholarships (JUNAEB)
 Centro de Perfeccionamiento, Experimentación e Investigaciones Pedagógicas/Center for Improvement, Educational Research and Experimentation (CPEIP)
 Junta Nacional de Jardines Infantiles/National Board of Daycare (JUNJI)

List of ministers of education

PR – Partido Radical
PS – Partido Socialista
PDC – Partido Democrata Cristiano
PL – Partido Liberal
ind – Independent
PAL – Partido Agrario Laborista
PF – Partido Femenino de Chile
PSA – Partido Socialista Auténtico
FN – Falange Nacional
PN – Partido Nacional
UDI – Unión Demócrata Independiente
RN – Renovación Nacional
PPD – Partido por la Democracia

See also 

 Education in Chile

External links 
  
Links and Technology Education Center of the Ministry of Education 

 
Education
Chile
Chile, Education
1927 establishments in Chile